A Long Story may refer to:

 A Long Story (Anat Fort album)
 A Long Story (Eliane Elias album)